Palisade is a statutory town in Mesa County, Colorado, United States. It is part of the Grand Junction Metropolitan Statistical Area. The population was 2,565 at the 2020 census, down from 2,692 in 2010.

The community was named for the cliffs near the town site. Palisade is known for its peach orchards and wine vineyards. The climate, a 182-day growing season, and an average 78 percent of sunshine makes Palisade "The Peach Capital of Colorado".

Geography
Palisade is located at  (39.109335, -108.354277). U.S. Route 6 passes through the town as 8th Street, while Interstate 70 runs along the northern border of the town at the foot of the cliffs to the north, with access to the town from Exit 42 .

Climate
Palisade's climate is relatively mild by Colorado standards. Palisade falls within the USDA hardiness zone 7.

Demographics

As of the census of 2000, there were 2,579 people, 1,051 households, and 689 families residing in the town. The racial makeup of the town was 93.91% White, 0.19% African American, 1.05% Native American, 0.50% Asian, 0.27% Pacific Islander, 1.36% from other races, and 2.71% from two or more races. Hispanic or Latino of any race were 6.24% of the population.

There were 1,051 households, out of which 30.5% had children under the age of 18 living with them, 49.8% were married couples living together, 12.0% had a female householder with no husband present, and 34.4% were non-families. 29.5% of all households were made up of individuals, and 12.9% had someone living alone who was 65 years of age or older. The average household size was 2.35 and the average family size was 2.91.

In the town, the population was spread out, with 24.3% under the age of 18, 7.6% from 18 to 24, 26.5% from 25 to 44, 21.5% from 45 to 64, and 20.2% who were 65 years of age or older. The median age was 40 years. For every 100 females, there were 87.8 males. For every 100 females age 18 and over, there were 85.3 males.

The median income for a household in the town was $27,739, and the median income for a family was $31,797. Males had a median income of $28,231 versus $21,875 for females. The per capita income for the town was $15,539. About 11.0% of families and 14.0% of the population were below the poverty line, including 21.2% of those under age 18 and 10.7% of those age 65 or over.

Education
Palisade has one high school, Palisade High School. It also has one elementary school, Taylor Elementary. Mount Garfield Middle School is located on the border of Clifton and Palisade.

Notable people
 Clair Finch, Wisconsin state legislator and lawyer, was born in Palisade.

See also

 List of municipalities in Colorado

References

External links

 
 CDOT map of the Town of Palisade
 Palisade Tourism website
 Palisade Chamber of Commerce Retrieved August 10, 2012

Towns in Mesa County, Colorado
Towns in Colorado